Biella-Cerrione Airport (ICAO: LILE) is an airport in Cerrione, Italy, near Biella, that specialises in general aviation.

The operator of the airport was Società Aeroporto di Cerrione (SACE), which was owned by Fondazione Cassa di Risparmio di Biella, Tecno Holding and other investors.

References

External links

 Biella Airport
 Biella Airport 

Airports in Piedmont
Transport in Biella